Francis Bailey (September 3, 1744 – November 1, 1817) was an early American printer, publisher and journalist in Pennsylvania from 1771 to 1807.

He began publication of the Lancaster Almanac in Lancaster, PA in 1771 and published the United States Magazine in 1778. In 1781, he became editor of the Freeman's Journal. In addition to printing editions of the Articles of Confederation and Thomas Paine's Common Sense, he acted as printer for Congress and the Commonwealth of Pennsylvania.

Bailey was the first printer to refer to  George Washington, in print, as the Father of His Country. He was also the first to print the first official printing of the first U.S. constitution, then called The Articles of Confederation.

He was the first American publisher of the writings of Emanuel Swedenborg in 1787.

Bailey was taught the printing trade by Peter Miller in Ephrata, Lancaster county. In 1778 or 1779 he removed to Philadelphia where he published a newspaper. Eventually he returned to Lancaster. Bailey's daughter-in-law managed a press shop in Philadelphia in 1818.

References

Sources

External links
 The Inquirer Lancaster, Pennsylvania, 19 Feb 1887
 To George Washington from Francis Bailey, 2 February 1790
 Lancaster, January 4th, 1802. Honorable Sir. The following is a copy of an anonymous piece, without date, addressed- "Mr. Francis Bailey, State printer, Lancaster."
 Find A Grave

American printers
1744 births
1817 deaths
Colonial American printers